Lowden Homes is a Chicago Housing Authority (CHA) public housing project located in the Princeton Park neighborhood on the far South Side of Chicago, Illinois, United States. It is bordered by 91st and 95th Streets, Wentworth, and Eggleston Avenues.

History
Named for Illinois governor Frank Lowden, the housing project has 127 units made up of two-story rowhouses. It opened in 1954.

References

Neighborhoods in Chicago
Public housing in Chicago